"Justboy" is a song by Biffy Clyro from their 2002 debut album, Blackened Sky. It was the band's second single.

Overview
"Justboy" is a fan-favourite among Biffy Clyro fans. Simon Neil has commented on the song, saying:

Track listings
Songs and lyrics by Simon Neil. Music by Biffy Clyro.
CD BBQ335CD, 7" BBQ335
 "Justboy" – 4:23
 "Being Gabriel" – 6:20
 "Unsubtle" – 2:27

Personnel
 Simon Neil – guitar, vocals
 James Johnston – bass, vocals
 Ben Johnston – drums, vocals
 Chris Sheldon – producer

Notes

External links
"Justboy" Lyrics
"Justboy" Guitar Tablature

2001 songs
Biffy Clyro songs
Songs written by Simon Neil
Song recordings produced by Chris Sheldon
Beggars Banquet Records singles
2001 singles